The Woady Yaloak River is a perennial river of the Corangamite catchment, located in the Western District Lakes region of the Australian state of Victoria.

Location and features
From its highest point, the river descends  over its meandering  course.

The river is crossed by the Glenelg Highway west of Scarsdale and the Hamilton Highway at Cressy, and McMillans Bridge on the Rokewood-Skipton Road between Rokewood and Werneth.

Etymology
In the Aboriginal Australian Wathawurrung language different sections of the river are given two names, Wurdi-yaluk or sometimes Wurdi-yaluk gundidj, meaning "big creek"; and Currarerer, with no defined meaning. Variations on the spelling of the river's name have included Wandinyallock, Wardiyallock and Worriyallock.

See also

References

External links

Corangamite catchment
Rivers of Barwon South West (region)
Rivers of Grampians (region)
Colac, Victoria